The Yerevan State Institute of Theatre and Cinematography (YSITC) is a state university and higher education institution based in Yerevan, the capital of Armenia.

The university was founded in 1944 as the Yerevan State Institute of Theatrical Arts. In 1953, it was united with the State Academy of Fine Arts of Armenia and functioned as a part of the Yerevan State Institute of Art and Theater until 1994. In 1994 the Yerevan State Institute of Art and Theater was divided into the State Academy of Fine Arts and Yerevan State Institute of Theater. The institute became independent and is now the Yerevan State Institute of Theatre and Cinematography.

History 
Theater in Armenia has a centuries-old history and dates back to pagan rituals, for example, worship of death and resurrection of God Gisane – Ara the Beautiful and celebration of coming of spring in honor of fertility and healing goddess Anahit. Armenian tragedy dzajnarku-gusan and vohbergak, comedy genre katakergak and kataka-gusan, known from 1 century b.c., served as a base for further development of professional theater.

The institute was established in 1944, as the Yerevan State Institute of Theatrical Arts. The institute had three departments:
acting skill
directing
drama studies

From 1950 the number of enrollees had been declining (because of the WWII). Due to that the government decided to merge two institutes - the Yerevan State Institute of Theatrical Arts and the State Academy of Fine Arts of Armenia. As a result, in 1953 the new institute was formed and was named the Yerevan State Institute of Art and Theater until 1994.

In 1994 after Armenian independence and due to political changes, the government decided to split the institute into two separate institutions – the State Academy of Fine Arts of Armenia and the Yerevan State Institute of Theater.

In 1999, the institute was restructured and became known as the Yerevan State Institute of Theatre and Cinematography, with a major expansion in its specialties.

Specialties
The university has 12 main specialties:
Acting: actor or actress in drama or musical theater, pantomime, puppetry, television and circus.
Stage direction: theater director, film director
Dance
Cinematography: film director, director of documentaries, animation film director, filmmaker, TV director, sound engineer 
Drama studies
Film studies
Literature
Operator
Visual arts: scenography, art director, multiplication 
Socio-cultural work (art management)
Digital art, computer architecture 
Costume design
and several minor specialties

Faculties
The university is currently home to 3 faculties:
Faculty of Theatre
Faculty of Cinema, TV and Animation
Faculty of Art History, Theory and Management (Arts administration)

Faculty of Theatre
Department was opened in 2011 as a result of restructuration of the faculty of theater and cinematography. Specialties:
Drama theater actor
Musical theater actor
Pantomime actor
Puppeteer
Actor of mass events
Host
Director of drama theater
Director of musical theater
Director of mass events
Director of puppetry

Chairs
Acting and directing
Stage Movement and Vocal Training

Faculty of Cinema, TV and Animation
Faculty was founded in 2011. Fields:
Cinematography
 Camera operator
Painting

Specialties:
Film director
Director of documentary films
TV director
 Sound engineer
Camera operator
Scene decorator
Set decorator
Costume design

The faculty consists of two chairs:
Cinematography and television
 Fine Arts and Animation

Cinematography and television chair
It was established in 2001, after restructuration in 2011 became known as chair of Cinematography and television. Specialties:
Film director
Director of documentary films
Director of animated films
TV director
Advertising director and director of video clips
Sound engineer 
Camera operator

Fine Arts and Animation chair
Chair was founded in 2011. Specialties:
Scenography
Set decorator
Animator

Faculty of Art History, Theory and Management (arts administration)
Faculty was founded in 2011. It consists of the following chairs:
 Art History and Theory
 Art Management and Cultural Policy
Social sciences

Specialties:
Drama studies
Film studies
Literature
Socio-cultural work (art administration)

Art History and Theory chair
Chair covers several areas of art studies:
Theater
Cinematography
History of fine arts and music
Literature

Specialties:
Drama studies
Film studies (master program)
Literature (bachelor program)
Acting
Directing
Choreographer
 Camera operator
Socio-cultural work
 Scenography

Art Management and Cultural Policy Chair
Chair was established in 2011 and combined chair of socio-cultural management, that was founded in 2003. Specialties:
Art administration
History of advertisement 
PR
Marketing 
Economics
Ecological studies
Jurisprudence
Sociology of art
History of theatre
Administration and communication

Social sciences chair
Chair was established in 1944. Academic program includes following subjects:
History of Armenian literature
History of Russian literature
Armenian language
Russian language
Foreign language
Philosophy
Mythology
Literary theory
Linguistics
History of religions
Psychology of art
Culturology
Rituals

In 2014, the part-time faculty was founded for distance education with the specialties of Choreography Directing, Cinematographic Art and Sociocultural Activity.

Educational programs 
As of 2015, 795 students are enrolled in the head university and 214 students in the branches. The university has two options of educational process for two-level degree (bachelor and master, 4 and 2 years accordingly):
full-time
extramural.

There are also postgraduate studies (full-time and extramural).

The institute collaborates with several international universities. Students participate in state and international art competitions, festivals and often become laureates and prize-winners.

Since 1961 international students including Armenians from the diaspora (from Russia, United States, Georgia, Syria, Lebanon, Iran, Jordan, Bulgaria, etc.) enroll at the university.

The educational process is organized in specialized auditoriums, workshops, pavilions, cinema and video halls. There are 225 places in student theater. This is repertory theater, that operates all year round. The institutes hold a rich collection of more than 40,000 specialized books in its library, as well as films and videos. The institute publishes a monthly journal Handes that includes scientific and methodological articles of professors and students.

Branches
The institute has branches in three cities of the Republic:
Gyumri
Vanadzor
Goris

The Institute in Gyumri
The Gyumri Branch was founded by the governmental decision No.231 in 1997. It is the only higher educational institution in the field of theater working in the Shirak Province.

Educational process is held on the following specialties:
acting (actor in drama theatre and cinema)
director of drama theater
TV director
camera operator (cinema operator)
choreography
scenography (set decorator)

Around 110 students are studying in the university (both full-time and extramural). Since 2007–2008 academic year the university provides two-stage educational programs – bachelor's and master's degree. The university implemented academic credit system. Educational process is organized based on plans and programs approved by the head university and in compliance with the up-to-date regulations.

Chairs:
Acting and directing
Cinematography
Art history
Social sciences

Substantial part of educational process is student theater. The institute hold specialized competitions – scenic speech, singing, dance, “best duet acting”, “best directing work”, “best photography.” After completing courses students find jobs in Gyumri Drama Theater named after V. Ajemian, Gyumri Puppetry Theater named after S. Alikhanian, tele and radio companies. Many students continue their education in post-graduate programs. There is a preparatory department.

The Institute in Vanadzor
The Vanadzor Branch was founded by the governmental decision No.1283 in 2003. Specialties:
Acting – 6 students
Directing – 6 students

In the 2005–2006 academic year, the department of cinematography was opened. In 2008–2009, the departments of choreography and camera operator, in 2010–2011, art administration and in 2011-2012 masters programs in the fields of acting, directing and cinematography were opened.

By 2012, 55 students and in 2012 – 16 students have graduated from the institute. Currently 78 students are enrolled in the university.

The Institute in Goris
The Goris branch was founded by the governmental decision No.547 in 2004. In 2007 the institute was registered.

Educational process is held on the following specialties:
Acting
Directing
Choreography
Camera operator.

First application process was held only at the acting department. In 2004–2005 academic year 10 students enrolled in the institute, 2005-2006 – 9 students, 2006-2007 – 5 students, 2007-2008 – 8 students, 2008-2009 – 4 students, 2009-2010 – 7 students, 2010-2011 – 4 students, 2011-2012 – 12 students. Now 25 students are studying in the institute.

The following performances were stages as final works:
Christmas at the Cupiello's House – Eduardo De Filippo
Hello Out There!, The Ping-Pong Players, The Hungerers - William Saroyan
The Miracle Child – Z. Khalatyan
Midnight robber – M. Mitrovich
Listen to the tsar, Master and Servant, A Cat and A Dog that were based on the fairy-tales written by Hovannes Tumanyan
Foreign Fiance, When There is no Eyes in the House - Aramashot Papayan
The Colonel Bird – Hristo Boychev

At the theater festival in Lori, students of the university took prizes in following categories:
Best ensemble
Best young actor
Best young actress

Rectorate and academic staff
Academic staff of the university includes best artists of the Republic, who are known not only in the country but even far beyond – popular artists, laureates of international contests, State Prizes in addition to 39 professors, 38 docents, 102 lecturers and teachers.

Rectors
Vavik Vartanian (1949-1952)
Ara Sargsian (1953-1959)
Martin Zarian (1959-19(?))
Vaagn Mkrtchian (19(?)-1994)
Vahe Shahverdian (1994-1997)
Sos Sargsyan (1997-2005)
Hrachya Gasparian (2005-2010)
Armen Mazmanyan (2010-2014)
David Muradian (2014–present)

Academic staff and famous alumnus
Over the years several well-known artists taught in the university or some of the alumnus became prominent artists including Victor Abajian, Khoren Abrahamyan, Vagharsh Vagharshian, Armen Gulakian, Aleksey Djivelegov, Vahram Zaryan, Karen Kocharyan, Henrik Malyan, Yervand Manaryan, Gudj Manukyan, Frunzik Mkrtchyan, Vladimir Msryan, Edvard Muradyan, Nerses Hovhannisyan, Michael Poghosyan, Sabir Rizaev, Metaksia Simonyan, Tigran Shamirhanyan, Arthur Elbakyan and Edgar Elbakyan.

References

External links 
 

Educational institutions established in 1944
Yerevan State Institute of Theatre and Cinematography
1944 establishments in the Soviet Union